Jonathan Marray and Jamie Murray chose not to defend their 2010 title.
Frederik Nielsen and Ken Skupski won the title, because their opponents, Michail Elgin and Alexandre Kudryavtsev, withdrew before the final.

Seeds

Draw

Draw

References
 Doubles Draw

Internazionali Trismoka - Doubles
2011 Doubles